Brian Lebler (born July 16, 1988) is an Austrian professional ice hockey right winger, who currently playing for the Steinbach Black Wings Linz of the ICE Hockey League (ICEHL).

Playing career
Lebler began his professional career during the 2010–11 season after playing four years of Division I college hockey with the Michigan Wolverines. He split his first season with the Syracuse Crunch of the American Hockey League and the ECHL's Elmira Jackals. For the 2011–12 season, Lebler joined EHC Black Wings Linz of the Austrian Hockey League (EBEL). He received the Ron Kennedy Trophy as the Most Valuable Player of the 2014-15 EBEL season, after scoring 35 goals and dealing out 18 assists in 54 regular season games. He also made twelve playoff-appearances with six goals and seven assists that season.

On May 27, 2015, Lebler left the Black Wings after four seasons and signed a one-year contract with German club, ERC Ingolstadt of the DEL. He returned to Linz after one season in Germany.

International play
Lebler was named to Team Austria's official 2014 Winter Olympics roster on January 7, 2014.

Personal

Lebler and his wife, Kelsey, had their first child, Blakely, on March 16, 2013. The couple welcomed their second child, Tucker, on March 9, 2015.

Career statistics

Regular season and playoffs

International

References

External links

1988 births
Living people
Austrian ice hockey right wingers
EHC Black Wings Linz players
Elmira Jackals (ECHL) players
ERC Ingolstadt players
Ice hockey players at the 2014 Winter Olympics
Michigan Wolverines men's ice hockey players
Olympic ice hockey players of Austria
Penticton Vees players
EC Red Bull Salzburg players
Sportspeople from Klagenfurt
Syracuse Crunch players